Donald Thomas Regan (December 21, 1918 – June 10, 2003) was the 66th United States Secretary of the Treasury from 1981 to 1985 and the White House Chief of Staff from 1985 to 1987 under Ronald Reagan. In the Reagan administration, he advocated "Reaganomics" and tax cuts as a means to create jobs and to stimulate production.

Earlier in his life, he had studied at Harvard University before he served in the United States Marine Corps, achieving the rank of lieutenant colonel. In 1946 he started to work for Merrill Lynch. He served as its chairman and CEO from 1971 to 1980.

Early life
Born in Cambridge, Massachusetts, the son of Kathleen (née Ahearn) and William Francis Regan, he was of Irish Catholic origins. Regan earned his Bachelor of Arts in English from Harvard College in 1940 and attended Harvard Law School before dropping out to join the Marine Corps at the outset of World War II.

He reached the rank of lieutenant colonel while he was serving in the Pacific Theater. He was involved in five major campaigns, including Guadalcanal and Okinawa.

In 1942, Regan married the former Ann George Buchanan (1921–2006) with whom he had four children: Donna Regan Lefeve, Donald T. Regan, Jr., Richard William Regan, and Diane Regan Doniger.

Wall Street

After the war, he joined Merrill Lynch & Co., Inc. in 1946 as an account executive trainee. He worked up through the ranks, eventually taking over as Merrill Lynch's chairman and CEO in 1971, the year the company went public. He held those positions until 1980.

Regan was one of the original directors of the Securities Investor Protection Corporation and was vice chairman of the New York Stock Exchange from 1973 to 1975. He was a major proponent of brokerage firms going public, which he viewed as an important step in the modernization of Wall Street. Under his supervision, Merrill Lynch had its initial public offering on June 23, 1971, becoming only the second Wall Street firm to go public. (Donaldson, Lufkin & Jenrette was the first.)

During his tenure in these two positions, Regan pushed hard for an end to minimum fixed commissions for brokers, which were fees that brokerage companies had to charge clients for every transaction they made on the clients' behalf. Regan saw them as a cartel-like restriction. His lobbying played a large part of fixed commissions being abolished in 1975.

Reagan administration
President Ronald Reagan selected Donald Regan in 1981 to serve as Treasury Secretary, marking him as a spokesman for his economic policies, dubbed "Reaganomics". He helped engineer changes in the tax code, reduce income tax rates, and decrease taxes for corporations. Regan unexpectedly swapped jobs with then White House Chief of Staff James Baker in 1985. As chief of staff, Regan was closely involved in the day-to-day management of White House policy, which led Howard Baker, Regan's successor as chief of staff, to give a rebuke that Regan was becoming a "prime minister" inside an increasingly-complex Imperial Presidency.  During his four years as Secretary of the Treasury, Regan did not have a single one-to-one meeting with the president.  Regan was forced to resign for repeatedly disagreeing with the First Lady and for his role in the Iran–Contra affair. The Tower Commission, established by President Reagan to investigate the scandal, concluded that Donald Regan was responsible for the "chaos" that took hold of the White House. "More than almost any Chief of Staff in recent memory, he asserted control over the White House staff and sought to extend this control to the National Security Adviser. He was personally active in national security affairs, and attended almost all the relevant meetings regarding the Iran initiative. He, as much as anyone, should have insisted that an orderly process be observed."

Regan's 1988 memoir, For the Record: From Wall Street to Washington, exposes his disagreements with First Lady Nancy Reagan, revealing publicly that she had a personal astrologer who was later revealed to be Joan Quigley with whom she consulted and who helped steer the president's decisions. Regan wrote:

Virtually every major move and decision the Reagans made during my time as White House Chief of Staff was cleared in advance with a woman in San Francisco [Quigley] who drew up horoscopes to make certain that the planets were in a favorable alignment for the enterprise."The President's Astrologers", People (May 23, 1988)

Ronald and Nancy Reagan denied that astrology influenced any policies or decisions.

Donald Regan is portrayed by Frank Moore in the 2003 TV movie The Reagans.

Sayings
"And the horse you rode in on" was a favorite saying of Regan. He learned it from a poker buddy in Texas who said "fuck you and the horse you rode in on." Regan adopted the latter part of the phrase. In the portrait of Regan that hangs on the third floor of the treasury, the title of a book in the background reads And the Horse You Rode In On.

"You've got to give loyalty down if you want loyalty up."

Retirement
Regan retired quietly in Virginia with Ann Regan, his wife of over 60 years. In late life, he spent nearly 10 hours a day in his art studio painting landscapes. He had four children and nine grandchildren.

Death
Regan died of cancer on June 10, 2003, at the age of 84, in a hospital near his home in Williamsburg, Virginia, and was served by Nelsen Funeral Home. His remains were interred at Arlington National Cemetery.

References

Further reading
 Regan, Donald T. For the Record: From Wall Street to Washington (1988)
 Johns, Andrew L. ed. A Companion to Ronald Reagan (2015)
 Zaleznik, Abraham. "A Disengaged President: Ronald Reagan and His Lieutenants." Hedgehogs and Foxes (Palgrave Macmillan, New York, 2008) pp. 23–43.

External links
 Biography as Secretary of the Treasury
 

|-

1918 births
2003 deaths
20th-century American politicians
20th-century American memoirists
American chief executives of financial services companies
United States Marine Corps personnel of World War II
American people of Irish descent
Deaths from cancer in Virginia
Harvard College alumni
Massachusetts Republicans
Politicians from Cambridge, Massachusetts
Politicians from Williamsburg, Virginia
Reagan administration cabinet members
United States Marine Corps officers
United States Secretaries of the Treasury
White House Chiefs of Staff
Harvard Law School alumni
Merrill (company) people